The Free State of Waldeck-Pyrmont, later the Free State of Waldeck, was a constituent state of the Weimar Republic. It was created following the German Revolution which forced Prince Friedrich of Waldeck and Pyrmont along with the other German monarchs to abdicate.

On 30 November 1921, following a local plebiscite, the city and district of Pyrmont were detached and incorporated into the Prussian province of Hanover. The remainder of the State was incorporated into the Free State of Prussia on 1 May 1929, following another plebiscite, and became part of the province of Hesse-Nassau. The territory is today part of the District of Waldeck-Frankenberg in Hesse.

State directors (1918–1929) 
1918–1920  Karl von Redern
1920–1929  Wilhelm Schmieding (DVP)
1929–1929  Herbert Herberg

External links 
 Waldeck Free State
 States of Germany since 1918

States of the Weimar Republic
Former states and territories of Hesse